Kaind is a small village about 14 kilometers south of Ludhiana, Punjab, India. It is located on Malerkotla road, a community of about 1000 residents.

Many of its former residents now reside in United States, Canada, UK and Australia.  The main surname is "Pannu" and others include "Sandhu","Sidhu","Dhillon" and "Grewal". About 9 families live in or around Bay Area CA. There is a number of Pannu families in both Surrey, British Columbia and Brampton, Ontario.

References 

  
Villages in Ludhiana district